Piaçaca River is a river of Amapá state in Brazil. It is a tributary of the Vila Nova River which in turn is part of the Amazon River basin.

Rivers of Amapá